Paul Caillaud (14 September 1917 in La Copechagnière – 15 August 2008) was a French pharmacist and politician. He represented the Independent Republicans (from 1962 to 1978) and the Union for French Democracy (from 1978 to 1981) in the National Assembly. He was the mayor of La Roche-sur-Yon from 1961 to 1977.

Political career
On 16 December 1961, Caillaud was elected mayor of La Roche-sur-Yon. He remained in this position until 14 March 1977, when Socialist Party candidate Jacques Auxiette became mayor.

In 1967, he was elected to Vendée at the expense of incumbent Lionel de Tinguy du Pouët. He was reelected in 1968 in 1973 and 1978. He first served under the label of the Independent Republicans before joining the Union for French Democracy in 1978. Candidate in 1981 as an alternate to Philippe Mestre, he then left the French National Assembly.

His brother, Martial Caillaud, was mayor of L'Herbergement from 1965 to 1987 and general counsel of canton de Rocheservière of 1973 to 1987.

His nephew Dominique Caillaud, son of the former, was mayor of Saint-Florent-des-Bois of 1977 to 2008, General Council of Vendée from 1988 to 2001, and a member of the second district of Vendee from 1997 to 2012.

Awards
 Chevalier of the Legion of Honour

References

External links
  TV interview of Paul Caillaud on development projects La Roche-sur-Yon, 19 November 1965

1917 births
2008 deaths
People from Vendée
Independent Republicans politicians
Union for French Democracy politicians
Deputies of the 3rd National Assembly of the French Fifth Republic
Deputies of the 4th National Assembly of the French Fifth Republic
Deputies of the 5th National Assembly of the French Fifth Republic
Deputies of the 6th National Assembly of the French Fifth Republic
Mayors of places in Pays de la Loire
Chevaliers of the Légion d'honneur
French pharmacists